"Rise" is a song by Belgian DJ Lost Frequencies. It was released on 19 March 2021 via Epic. The song was written and performed by Jeffrey Goldford (artist known GoldFord). Writers also include Jonas D. Kröper, Martijn van Sonderen, Yoshi L.H. Breen and Lost Frequencies, who also produced it.

Composition
The song is written in the key of A♭ Minor, with a tempo of 122 beats per minute.

Critical reception
Chad Downs of Cultr felt the song is "an incredibly soulful vocal verse soon takes the space, delivering a message of triumph over hardship." And commented that it like "a club-track, but carries emotional elements that adds a sad-song spice to it."

Charts

Weekly charts

Year-end charts

Certifications

References

2021 songs
2021 singles
Lost Frequencies songs
Deep house songs
Songs written by Lost Frequencies